Erika Remberg (15 February 1932 – 10 November 2017) was an Austrian film actress. She appeared in 31 films between 1950 and 1970. She was born in Medan, Indonesia.

Selected filmography
 Laila (1958)
 The Violin Maker of Mittenwald (1950)
 Salto Mortale (1953)
 Sun Over the Adriatic (1954)
 Hubertus Castle (1954)
 Beloved Enemy (1955)
 I Was an Ugly Girl (1955)
 Sarajevo (1955)
  (1956)
 Laila (1958)
 Circus of Horrors (1960)
  (1960)
 Murder in Rio (1963)
 Saturday Night Out (1964)
 Cave of the Living Dead (1964)
 Living It Up (1966)
 Target for Killing (1966)
 The Saint. The Helpful Pirate. S5 E5 (1966)
 So Much Naked Tenderness (1968)
 The Lickerish Quartet (1970)

References

External links

1932 births
2017 deaths
Austrian film actresses
Austrian television actresses
20th-century Austrian actresses
People from Medan